Mutyala Muggu is a 1975 Indian Telugu-language drama film adaptation of Uttara Ramayana from the writer-director duo of Ramana and Bapu. The film stars Sangeeta, Sreedhar, Kanta Rao, Rao Gopal Rao, Mukkamala, Allu Ramalingaiah and Nutan Prasad. The film has garnered two National Film Awards. The film recorded as blockbuster at the box office. Rao Gopal Rao received widespread acclaim for his role. The film was remade in Hindi as Jeevan Jyoti (1976).

Plot
Raja Rao Bahadur (Kanta Rao) is the head of a wealthy and charitable landlord family who has a young son Sreedhar. At his son's request, Rao helps his college friend (Hari) with the costs of higher education abroad. Hari is grateful and invites Sreedhar to his sister Laxmi's (Sangeeta) wedding in the village. Due to unusual circumstances, Sreedhar ends up marrying Lakshmi. This enrages Mukkamala who is the Raja's brother-in-law, who was hopeful of getting his daughter (Jaya Malini) married to Sreedhar.

What makes matters worse is that Laxmi wins over the royal household with her humility and good nature while Sreedhar falls in love with her innocence. She accidentally discovers a stash of the estate jewels in a well. Joginatham and Mukkamala try to implicate the Priest. Laxmi suggests that since they do not know conclusively as to who stole jewels, they should spare the Priest. Mukkamala, at the suggestion of the estate manager Joginatham (Allu Ramalingiah), then approaches Contractor (Rao Gopala Rao). Contractor agrees to break up the couple. But Contractor eyes the entire estate and its valuables and he entrap Mukkamala. He uses Kishtaiyya (Nutan Prasad) and creates suspicion in Sreedhar's mind with a sinister plan. Sreedhar falls prey to his doubts, comes to the conclusion that Laxmi is cheating on him and is only interested in his wealth.

He sends off pregnant Laxmi with all the family jewels. Laxmi gives the jewels off to Joginatham and decides to end her life. She is rescued by the Priest at whose house she gives birth to twins (a boy and a girl). Meanwhile, back at the estate, Sreedhar is depressed and loses interest in life and curses out Mukkamala when he proposes that Sreedhar should marry his daughter. The contractor then fixes up Kishtayya with Jaya Malini and proceeds to squeeze Mukkamala out of his money. After that, he takes possession of several antiques that Joginatham was trying to sell.

All that's left is the Deity's Jewels. The Raja who is distraught with the whole lifeless situation of the estate decides to leave the Deity's Jewels in the temple itself and wanders the villages. He stumbles upon Laxmi's kids (his grandkids), discovers the truth and requests Laxmi to come back. Laxmi refuses to come back and declares that this does not work with recommendations and that Sreedhar himself has to accept his mistake and come to her and ask her to come back. The Raja with the help of the kids and Sreedhar's friend hatch a plan to set things right with Sreedhar and beat the Contractor at his own game.

Cast
 Sangeeta as Lakshmi, Sreedhar's wife
 Sreedhar as Sreedhar, Raja Rao's son
 Kanta Rao as Raja Rao Bahadur
 Rao Gopal Rao as Contractor
 Allu Ramalingaiah as Joginadham
 Mukkamala as Raja's brother-in-law
 Sakshi Ranga Rao
 Nutan Prasad as Kishtayya
 Jayamalini as Kistayya's wife
 Suryakantam as Contractor's wife
 Pisupati Venkateswara Rao as temple Pujari
Mada

Production
The movie was shot mostly outdoors in the Gyan Bagh Palace in Hyderabad and on the Pulidindi Canal.

Soundtrack
 "Entati Rasikudavo Teliseraa"
 Lyrics by C. Narayana Reddy, Playback Singer: P. Susheela & Composed by K.V. Mahadevan
 "Gogulu Pooche Gogulu Kache O Laccha Gummadi"
 Lyrics by C. Narayana Reddy, Playback Singer: P. Susheela & S.P. Balasubrahmanyam & Composed by K.V. Mahadevan
 "Edo Edo Annadi Eee Masaka Veluturu"
 Lyrics by C. Narayana Reddy, Playback Singer: V. Ramakrishna & Composed by K.V. Mahadevan
 "Nidurinche Totaloki Paata Okati Vachindi"
 Lyrics by Gunturu Seshendra Sharma, Playback Singer: P. Susheela & Composed by K.V. Mahadevan
 "Mutyamanta Pasupu Mukhamento Chhaaya"
 Lyrics by Arudra, Playback Singer: P. Susheela & Composed by K.V. Mahadevan
 "Sri Rama Jayarama Seetarama"
 Lyrics by Arudra, Playback Singer: M. Balamuralikrishna & Composed by K.V. Mahadevan

Awards
National Film Awards - 1975
 National Film Award for Best Feature Film in Telugu
 National Film Award for Best Cinematography - Ishan Arya

Nandi Awards - 1975
 Second Best Feature Film - Silver - M. V. L. Narasimha Rao

References

1975 films
1970s Telugu-language films
Films based on the Ramayana
Indian fantasy drama films
Films directed by Bapu
Films whose cinematographer won the Best Cinematography National Film Award
1970s fantasy drama films
Films scored by Sajjad Hussain
Telugu films remade in other languages
Films scored by K. V. Mahadevan
Best Telugu Feature Film National Film Award winners
1975 drama films